Cliff Hucul (born August 21, 1948, Prince George, British Columbia), is a former driver in the USAC and CART Championship Car series.  He raced in the 1977–1981 seasons, with 24 combined career starts, including the 1977-1979 Indianapolis 500.  He finished in the top ten 8 times, with his best finish in 4th position in 1979 at Texas World Speedway.

He later made two NASCAR Winston Cup starts in 1986, finishing 40th and 31st (at the 1986 running of the Delaware 500).

Racing career results

NASCAR Winston Cup Series

Indy 500 results

See also

List of Canadians in NASCAR
List of Canadians in Champ Car

References

External links
Driver Database Profile

1948 births
Racing drivers from British Columbia
Living people
Indianapolis 500 drivers
NASCAR drivers
Sportspeople from Prince George, British Columbia